Belling is a surname. Notable people with the surname include:

 Johann Georg von Belling (1642–1689), Prussian general
 John Belling (1866–1933), English cytogenetist
 Kylie Belling Australian actress
 Mark Belling (born 1956), Radio talk show host
 Natarsha Belling (born 1970), Australian news anchor
 Rudolf Belling (1896–1972), German sculptor
 Wilhelm Sebastian von Belling (1719–1779), Prussian general
 Charles Reginald Belling (1884–1965), manufacturer of electric cookers

See also
 Belling, an English manufacturer of ovens, cookers etc., now owned by Glen Dimplex